Donald Eugene Heap (September 28, 1912 – March 21, 2016) was an American football and baseball player and  coach. He was twice selected as an All-American football player while playing for the Northwestern Wildcats football team.

Early years
Heap was born in 1912 in Evanston, Illinois, the son of Frank Heap and Rosella (Van Geem) Heap.  He attended Evanston Township High School, where he played football, basketball, and baseball, and graduated in 1930.

Northwestern
Heap subsequently enrolled at Northwestern University in Evanston, where he played football and basketball, and was a member of Phi Delta Theta.  He played at the halfback position for the Northwestern Wildcats football team from 1936 to 1938.  As a sophomore, he was selected by the Central Press Association as a first-team halfback on the 1936 College Football All-America Team.  As a senior, he served as the captain of Northwestern's football team, was named its most valuable player and was selected by Paramount News to the 1938 College Football All-America Team.  In his three years at Northwestern, Heap was a triple-threat player, handling kicking, passing and rushing responsibilities and calling signals for the team.  He averaged more than five yards per carry. Northwestern coach Pappy Waldorf said that Heap had one of the best football minds he had encountered.

Coaching career
After graduating from Northwestern, Heap was hired as the head football and baseball coach at Illinois Wesleyan University, where he served for three years.  His teams won two Illinois College Conference championships.

During World War II, Heap served in the United States Navy, attaining the rank of lieutenant commander. His naval service included one year as an assistant coach for the Iowa Pre-Flight Seahawks football team at the University of Iowa. He also served at a naval aviation base in Devonshire, England.

In 1946, after his discharge from the Navy, Heap was hired by Northwestern University as its freshman football coach and assistant baseball coach.  In 1947, Heap became head baseball coach at Northwestern and continued his position with the football team.  Heap served two seasons as head baseball coach, compiling a 21–25–1 record from 1947 to 1948.

Head coaching record

Football

References

1912 births
2016 deaths
American football halfbacks
Illinois Wesleyan Titans baseball coaches
Illinois Wesleyan Titans football coaches
Iowa Pre-Flight Seahawks football coaches
Northwestern Wildcats baseball coaches
Northwestern Wildcats football coaches
Northwestern Wildcats football players
United States Navy personnel of World War II
United States Navy officers
Sportspeople from Evanston, Illinois
Players of American football from Illinois
American centenarians
Men centenarians
Military personnel from Illinois